Jeffrey Christopher Horn Jr. (born 4 February 1988) is an Australian professional boxer who held the WBO welterweight title from 2017 to 2018. As an amateur he represented Australia at the 2012 Olympics, reaching the quarterfinals of the light-welterweight bracket.

Amateur career
As a relative newcomer to the sport, Horn won his first Australian title in 2009 and repeated the feat in 2011. He went on to win a silver medal at the Gee-Bee Tournament in Helsinki and compete at the 2011 AIBA World Boxing Championships in Baku where he lost to eventual champion Everton Lopes in the second round. In 2012, he picked up his third Australian title and first Oceania title to earn a spot at the London Olympics.

2012 London Olympics

Results
Men's light-welterweight (64 kg)
 Round of 32 (first match): defeated Gilbert Choombe, Zambia (5)
 Round of 16 (second match): defeated Abderrazak Houya, Tunisia (11)
 Quarterfinals (third match): lost to Denys Berinchyk, Ukraine (21)

Professional career

Early career
Horn made his professional debut in Melbourne on 1 March 2013, winning by second-round technical knockout. In just his seventh pro bout he outpointed two-time world title challenger and former IBF #1 contender Naoufel Ben Rabah. On 27 April 2016, Horn faced former two-division world champion Randall Bailey. After dropping Bailey in the second round, Horn was knocked down in the third round. Horn won by TKO after Bailey refused to get up from his corner before round eight. On 21 October 2016, Horn fought Rico Mueller and defeated the German by TKO in round nine. After the fight, the WBO ranked him the #2 welterweight in the world. On 10 December 2016, Horn faced former IBO welterweight champion Ali Funeka, whom he stopped in the sixth round. With Top Rank promoter Bob Arum in attendance, his win set up a potential showdown with eight-division world champion Manny Pacquiao.

Horn vs. Pacquiao

Horn signed up to face WBO welterweight champion Manny Pacquiao in Brisbane on 23 April 2017. The announcement of the fight was met with relative surprise and disappointment due to Horn's limited exposure on the world stage, which led Pacquiao to comment "I don't know who Jeff Horn is". A tweet on 12 February by Pacquiao complicated negotiations when he said that he planned to fight in the United Arab Emirates. On 26 February, Pacquiao and Amir Khan announced that they had reached an agreement to fight, leaving Horn without an opponent. On 7 March the fight with Khan was called off and on 5 April a deal for the Pacquiao–Horn fight was reached. A press conference on 10 April signaled confirmation of the fight, which took place at Suncorp Stadium on 2 July 2017. Horn defeated Pacquiao via unanimous decision after 12 rounds. CompuBox stats showed that Pacquiao landed 182 out of 573 punches thrown (32%), whilst Horn landed only 92 of 625 thrown (15%). Many pundits, as well as many current and former boxers, believed Pacquiao had done enough to retain the WBO title. 

Horn's win over Pacquiao was also  criticized by some boxing analysts, sports journalists and fans alike, with some comparing the decision to that of the controversial Pacquiao vs. Timothy Bradley fight. In regards to the controversial scorecards, ESPN's Dan Rafael scored the fight 117–111 and ESPN analyst Teddy Atlas scored it 116–111, both for Pacquiao. The Guardian and the International Business Times both scored the fight in Pacquiao's favor as well, 117–111. BoxingScene had it 116–112 for Pacquiao, while CBS Sports scored the fight 114–114 even. BoxNation's Steve Bunce scored the fight 115–113 for Horn. In total, 12 of 15 media outlets scored the bout for Pacquiao, 2 of 15 outlets ruled in favor of Horn and 1 scored a draw.

Pacquiao claimed Horn got away with numerous dirty tactics in the fight, using illegal blows including elbows and headbutts.

Rescore by WBO
In response to a formal request by the Philippine Games and Amusements Board, the WBO agreed to review the fight between Pacquiao and Horn. It was scored round-by-round by five anonymous judges, but the WBO stated that they do not have the power to reverse the original result of the fight. The WBO rescored the fight in favor of Horn winning seven rounds and Pacquiao winning five.

First title defence
Initially, Horn was to give Pacquiao a rematch, but the rematch was delayed and did not eventuate. As a result, Horn instead made a voluntary defence of the WBO title against Gary Corcoran on 13 December 2017. Corcoran's corner decided to throw in the towel in the eleventh round, thus Horn retained the title via TKO. Both fighters were cut during the fight, but Horn was leading on the scorecards at the time of the stoppage.

First loss
Horn was challenged by Terence Crawford on 9 June 2018, for the WBO welterweight title. Crawford defeated Horn via technical knockout in the ninth round, becoming the new WBO welterweight champion.

Middleweight

Horn vs Mundine 
Horn moved up to middleweight after the loss to Crawford and faced Anthony Mundine on 30 November 2018. He defeated Mundine in just 96 seconds.

Horn vs Zerafa 
Next, Horn faced Michael Zerafa on 31 August 2019 in Bendigo. For the second time in his career, Horn lost via technical knockout in the ninth round.

Horn vs Zerafa II 
Horn however won the rematch on 18 December 2019 by majority decision to bring his record to 20–2–1.

Horn vs Tszyu 
On 26 August, 2020, Horn faced one of Australia's best up-and-coming fighters Tim Tszyu. Tszyu was ranked #5 by the WBO at super welterweight. Tszyu dropped Horn twice, once in the third and once in the sixth round, and continued to dominate Horn until the end of the eighth round, when Horn's corner decided not to continue the fight.

Personal life
Horn lives in Brisbane and his father, Jeff Horn Sr., is a builder. Horn's mother, Liza Dykstra, works for the Saint Vincent de Paul Society. His grandfather, Ray Horn, fought in exhibition boxing matches in the Queensland outback during the 1930s. His second cousin is Graham Quirk, the former Lord Mayor of Brisbane.

Horn holds a Bachelor of Education degree from Griffith University and formerly worked as a physical education teacher for Pallara State School in Brisbane.

His daughter, Isabelle Kate Horn, was born on 30 December 2017.

In his youth, Horn had been a victim of bullying and cited this as the reason he started boxing, initially as a means to defend himself.

Awards and recognitions
October 2017 - Sport Australia Hall of Fame Don Award, recognising the sporting achievement of the year which has inspired the people of Australia.
November 2017 - Queensland Sport Star of the Year.
December 2017 - Sporting Moment of The Year at the Australian Institute of Sport Awards.

Professional boxing record

References

External links

Jeff Horn - Profile, News Archive & Current Rankings at Box.Live

1988 births
Living people
Boxers at the 2012 Summer Olympics
Olympic boxers of Australia
Boxers from Brisbane
Australian male boxers
World welterweight boxing champions
World Boxing Organization champions
People educated at MacGregor State High School
Griffith University alumni
Light-welterweight boxers
Schoolteachers from Queensland
Middleweight boxers
20th-century Australian people
21st-century Australian people
Sportsmen from Queensland